The 6th Grand Prix de Nice was a Grand Prix motor race held at Nice in France on 20 July 1947. The race was won by Luigi Villoresi, who started from pole, in a Maserati 4CL. Jean-Pierre Wimille was second in a Simca Gordini Type 15 and Fred Ashmore and Reg Parnell shared third place in an ERA A-Type, Parnell's own car having retired with gearbox problems. Raymond Sommer set fastest lap in a Maserati 4CL but retired after his car caught fire.

Classification

References

Nice
Nice